Silvia Hauser is an Austrian former cyclist. She won the Austrian National Road Race Championships in 1994.

References

External links
 

Year of birth missing (living people)
Living people
Austrian female cyclists
Place of birth missing (living people)